Alkabad (also Romanized as Alkābād and Alakābād; also known as Aulād Qibād and Owlād-e Qobād) is a village in Shirvan Rural District, in the Central District of Borujerd County, Lorestan Province, Iran. At the 2006 census, its population was 649, in 169 families.

References 

Towns and villages in Borujerd County